NPO Bazalt is a weapons manufacturing company in Russia that took over (or continued) the production of weapons such as the RPG-7 after the collapse of the Soviet Union. NPO Bazalt manufactures the RPG-7V2 and the RPG-29.  AO NPO Bazalt is included in the state corporation Rostec.

History
Bazalt was founded in 1916. Over its history, the company created 700 models of ammunition for military use. 

Bazalt is one of the leading designers and developers of many variants of aircraft bombs, anti-tank and anti-saboteur marine grenade launcher complexes, mortar shells of many variants, and calibers and other kinds of ammunition. The company's most famous product is the RPG-7, developed in the 1960s and used by the armies of over 40 countries, with over one million having been built by the company or on license by 2004.

Ammunition developed by Bazalt is used by the armed forces of over 80 countries in the world. Licenses for production of 61 types of ammunition were transferred to 11 countries in the world.

Since December 2012, Bazalt is a subsidiary of Techmash, a Rostec company.

Production
 RPG-7
 RPG-16
 RPG-18
 RPG-22
 RPG-26
 RPG-27
 RPG-28
 RPG-29
 RPG-30
 RPG-32
 PG-7VR
 PBK-500U Drel: Glide cluster bomb.

United States sanctions
Under EO 13661, the Obama administration on July 16, 2014, imposed sanctions on NPO Bazalt through the US Department of Treasury's Office of Foreign Assets Control (OFAC) by adding NPO Bazalt and other entities to the Specially Designated Nationals List (SDN) in retaliation for the ongoing Russo-Ukrainian War.

See also
 Norinco

References

External links
 http://www.bazalt.ru/ Company website
 http://www.bazalt.ru/en/ Company website English page
 http://www.norinco.com/ Norinco, Chinese weapon manufacturer of similar weapons such as the Type 69 RPG
 https://web.archive.org/web/20170908021309/http://www.defense-update.com/products/r/rpg-29.htm About the Bazalt RPG-29V

Firearm manufacturers of Russia
Defence companies of the Soviet Union
Tecmash
Federal State Unitary Enterprises of Russia
Russian brands
Russian entities subject to the U.S. Department of the Treasury sanctions